Strada is an Italian surname. Notable people with the surname include:

Alfonsina Strada (1891–1959), Italian cyclist
Anna Maria Strada, 18th-century Italian soprano
Gino Strada (1948–2021), surgeon and founder of the humanitarian organization Emergency
Vespasiano Strada (1582–1622), Italian painter and engraver
Zanobi da Strada, 14th-century Italian translator and correspondent of Petrarch

Italian-language surnames